Woolein is a rural locality in the Shire of Banana, Queensland, Australia.

References

Further reading 

  — includes Jooro State School, Lake Pleasant State School, Woolein State School, Rannes State School and Goovigen State School

Shire of Banana
Localities in Queensland